Cyperus humilis is a species of sedge that is native to southern parts of North America, Central America and northern parts of South America.

The species was first formally described by the botanist Carl Sigismund Kunth in 1837.

See also
 List of Cyperus species

References

humilis
Plants described in 1837
Taxa named by Carl Sigismund Kunth
Flora of Belize
Flora of Costa Rica
Flora of the Dominican Republic
Flora of Cuba
Flora of El Salvador
Flora of Ecuador
Flora of Guatemala
Flora of Haiti
Flora of Honduras
Flora of Jamaica
Flora of Mexico
Flora of Peru
Flora of Nicaragua
Flora of Venezuela
Flora without expected TNC conservation status